The Aplustridae is a taxonomic family of sea snails or bubble snails, marine gastropod mollusks in the superfamily Acteonoidea.

The former name of this family, Hydatinidae (Pilsbry, 1893) has been declared invalid.

Description
The soft parts of animals in this family are brightly colored.

The oval bubble-shaped shell is thin and fragile and has a sunken spire. The shell is white or beige-colored with colored bands or stripes.

There is no operculum.

Life habits
The soft parts of the animal cannot retract completely into the shell, and therefore these animals depend for their defense on swimming and camouflage. They are specialised feeders, eating cirratulinid polychaete worms.

Genera 
Genera within the family Aplustridae include:
 Aplustrum Schumacher, 1817
 Bullina A. Férussac, 1822
 Espinosina Ortea & Moro, 2017
 Hydatina Schumacher, 1817
 Micromelo Pilsbry, 1895
 Parvaplustrum Powell, 1981
 Rictaxiella Habe, 1958

References 

 Rudman, W.B. (1972) "The anatomy of the opisthobranch genus Hydatina and the functioning of the mantle cavity and the alimentary canal". Zoological Journal of the Linnean Society 51(2): 121-139
 Vaught, K.C.; Tucker Abbott, R.; Boss, K.J. (1989). A classification of the living Mollusca. American Malacologists: Melbourne. . XII, 195 pp
 Guangyu, 1997. Fauna Sinica Phylum Mollusca Class Gastropoda Subclass Opisthobranchia Order Cephalaspidea. 225pp., 28pls. (3col.pls.), 35 figs
 Powell A W B, New Zealand Mollusca, William Collins Publishers Ltd, Auckland, New Zealand 1979 
 Bouchet P., Rocroi J.P., Hausdorf B., Kaim A., Kano Y., Nützel A., Parkhaev P., Schrödl M. & Strong E.E. (2017). Revised classification, nomenclator and typification of gastropod and monoplacophoran families. Malacologia. 61(1-2): 1-526

External links 

 
Taxa named by John Edward Gray